Borg El Arab International Airport  (Arabic:مطار برج العرب الدولي) is the international airport of Alexandria, Egypt. The airport also serves the nearby areas of the Nile Delta.

History

In June 2009, governmental plans to develop an extension of Alexandria with an area of  located to the west of the old city were revealed. It would be later known as "New Alexandria". The new city is planned to be linked to Borg Al-Arab airport via the ring road with an estimated travel time of 25 minutes. The President also inaugurated Borg Al-Arab International Airport as one of the most recent in a series of new airports and development of old ones with the purpose of serving development. Borg El Arab Airport had a major expansion in terms of the airport's passenger and cargo handling capacity in response to growing demand and the new facilities were inaugurated in February 2010.

The airport has the capacity to handle 1.2 million passengers per year, becoming an adequate replacement to the then-larger El Nouzha Airport, which shut down in summer 2010; at the time, that airport's facilities were planned to be overhauled. After economic woes plagued the country following the 2011 Egyptian Revolution, the renovation of El Nouzha Airport was put on hold, leaving Borg El Arab as the only airport serving Alexandria. As of late 2020, there are no plans to finish El Nouzha's refurbishment, leaving Borg El Arab as the city's only operational airport.

Facilities

A brand new airport terminal was opened in February 2010, which consisted of a new passenger building and an administration building. The passenger terminal is designed in the shape of a boat and consists of three floors:
Ground floor: allocated for checking in and luggage handling.
Second floor: allocated for arrivals, both domestic and international, in addition to administrative offices and airlines offices.
Third floor: allocated for departures, both domestic and international, immigration procedures and a VIP hall. Commercial activities are spread among the three floors.
Four movable boarding bridges connect the terminal building to aircraft.

The terminal contains a duty-free shop, a franchise food court, an area dedicated for travel offices and other travel-related services, a fuel supply unit, a control tower, and a fire station available to cover emergencies on site. A parking area in front of the building provides space for 350 vehicles.

Airlines and destinations

See also 
List of airports in Egypt
Alexandria International Airport
Transportation in Alexandria

References

External links

Airports in Egypt
Transport in Alexandria
Buildings and structures in Alexandria